Camilo Varona was a figure in Latin American baseball. He played for Cienfuegos of the Cuban League. He managed the Aguascalientes Tigres of the Mexican Center League in 1963, being replaced by Daniel Rios partway through the campaign. In 1964, he led the Tabasco Plataneros of the Mexican Southeast League to a 52-35 record. He later became a scout, discovering Fernando Valenzuela and signing Mike Cuellar, among many others. He was born in Cuba.

References

Cuban baseball players
Living people
Year of birth missing (living people)